The Dean Crowe Theatre & Arts Centre is a theatre and arts space in Athlone, Westmeath, Ireland.

History
Built in 1800 the building served as the parish church for 137 years. The altar was placed against the wall in the middle of the building, seating on three sides, with three galleries overhead. In 1937 the present day church of SS. Peter and Paul was completed, and so the building was converted to use as a parochial hall, and later, a theatre and centre for the arts.

In the 1960s, the theatre building was home to the newly founded St. Aloysius College.

References

External links
Website

Buildings and structures in Athlone
County Westmeath
Theatres in the Republic of Ireland